In the Arms of Devastation is the eighth studio album by the Canadian death metal band Kataklysm.

Track listing

Notes
  The quote "Revenge is a meal best served cold" on Like Angels Weeping (The Dark) is taken from Man on Fire.

Personnel
Kataklysm
 Maurizio Iacono – vocals
 Jean-François Dagenais – guitar, producer
 Stéphane Barbe – bass guitar
 Max Duhamel – drums

Guest musicians
 Morgan Lander – guest vocals on It Turns to Rust
 Tim Roth – guest appearance on The Road to Devastation
 Rob Doherty – guest appearance on The Road to Devastation

Production
 Jean-François Dagenais - Producer, engineered
 Tue Madsen - Mixing, Mastering
 Maurizio Iacono - Lyrics
 Anthony Clarkson - Cover art
 Jean Luc Lavoie - Photography

References

2006 albums
Kataklysm albums
Nuclear Blast albums